Yambu may refer to:
Yanbu
Sycee, Chinese silver ingots, also known as yambu
Yambú, a form of Cuban rumba